Penicillium psychrosexualis is a filamentous fungus in the genus Penicillium. Described as new to science in 2010, the species was found growing on refrigerated moldy apples in the Netherlands. It is closely related to the blue cheese fungus P. roqueforti.

Discovery
Penicillium psychrosexualis was isolated in 2008 from a wooden crate in a cold, controlled atmosphere storage containing apples covered by the white mold Fibulorhizoctonia psychrophila. This mold is restricted to growth under . The Penicillium isolate was discovered during the culture of the white mold.

Systematics
Molecular phylogenetic analyses of the Penicillium fungus were performed using DNA sequences of the internal transcribed spacer region, partial β-tubulin and calmodulin genes. This information, in addition to analysis of excreted chemicals and macro- and microscopical characteristics, demonstrated that P. psychrosexualis belongs in the series Roqueforti (genus Penicillium, subgenus Penicillium sect. Roqueforti). This is grouping of related species with similar physiological characteristics that includes P. paneum, P. carneum, and P. roqueforti.

Description

Penicillium psychrosexualis cultures are velvety, bearing woolly tufts in the center, and colored dull to dark green when grown on Czapek yeast agar. The odor of the fungus is similar to its close relative P. roqueforti. The cleistothecia are initially white, soft, and sterile, but after about three to four months become pale orange-brown, typically measuring 100–175 μm in diameter. Ascospores are ellipsoidal, and measure 4–5 by 3–4 μm.

The fungus produces several secondary metabolites: andrastin A, mycophenolic acid, patulin, and roquefortine C. A chemically uncharacterized compound isolated from the fungus has been given the tentative name "fumu". The metabolite profile of P. psychrosexualis is similar to that of P. carneum, but the latter species lacks "fumu" while producing cyclopaldic acid, isofumigaclavine A, and penitrem A.

References

psychrosexualis
Fungi described in 2010
Fungi of Europe